Gregory M. Plunkett (born 21 February 1965 in Bayonne, New Jersey) is an American botanist.

References

Living people
1965 births
21st-century American botanists
People from New Jersey